A list of notable cartographers from Slovenia:

H 
 Ferdinand Augustin Hallerstein (1703–1774)

K 
 Alojz Knafelc (1859–1937)
 Peter Kosler

P 
 France Planina

V 
 Johann Weikhard von Valvasor

 
Cartographer

sl:Seznam slovenskih ekonomistov